The 27th New Zealand Parliament was a term of the New Zealand Parliament. It was elected at the 1943 general election in September of that year.

1943 general election

The 1943 general election was held on Friday, 24 September in the Māori electorates and on Saturday, 25 September in the general electorates, respectively.  A total of 80 MPs were elected; 48 represented North Island electorates, 28 represented South Island electorates, and the remaining four represented Māori electorates.  1,021,034 civilian voters were enrolled and the official turnout at the election was 82.8%. In addition, 92,934 military votes were cast.

Sessions
The 27th Parliament sat for three sessions, and was prorogued on 4 November 1946. The twenty-seventh parliament absent-mindedly increased its own life in 1946 when it was forgotten that because of the 24 to 25 September election in 1943 its three years of life ended on 11 October. The House sat to wind up the session without transacting any business on the following day and it was not dissolved until 4 November 1946 for election on 26 and 27 November.

Ministries
Peter Fraser of the Labour Party had been Prime Minister since 27 March 1940. He had formed the first Fraser Ministry on 1 April 1940 and the second Fraser Ministry on 30 April 1940.

A War Cabinet had been formed on 16 July 1940, which held the responsibility for all decisions relating to New Zealand's involvement in World War II. The War Cabinet was dissolved on 21 August 1945.

Party standings

Start of Parliament

End of Parliament

Members

Initial MPs

By-elections during 27th Parliament
There were a number of changes during the term of the 27th Parliament.

Notes

References

27